The 2013 WNBA season was the 17th season of the Women's National Basketball Association. The regular season began on May 24, and playoffs concluded on October 10. The Minnesota Lynx won their second league championship, defeating the Atlanta Dream three games to none in the 2013 WNBA Finals.
The year represented a positive turning point for the long-struggling league. Both attendance and television viewership were up, driven by an influx of talented rookies, multiple teams reported that they were near a break-even point, and at least one franchise announced that it was profitable.

2013 WNBA Draft

The WNBA Draft lottery was held on September 26, 2012. The lottery teams were the Washington Mystics, Phoenix Mercury, Tulsa Shock and Chicago Sky. The top pick was awarded to Phoenix Mercury. Center Brittney Griner was drafted first overall by the Phoenix Mercury.

TV and Internet coverage 
About 70+ games were aired on ESPN2, ABC and NBA TV. WNBA LiveAccess will offer complement - approximately 190 live games.

Regular season

The WNBA touted three exciting rookies -- Brittney Griner of the Phoenix Mercury, Elena Delle Donne of the Chicago Sky, and Skylar Diggins of the Tulsa Shock—as "three to see" going into the 2013 season. Griner - a tall, athletic center who had been dominant in college—was seen as such a potential game-changer that many picked the Mercury to win the WNBA championship.

It was Delle Donne, however, who turned out to have the breakout season, leading the Sky to the best record in the Eastern Conference, and their first trip to the playoffs. Griner was hampered by injuries, but her Phoenix team finished third in the West, and made it to the conference finals.

The Minnesota Lynx finished with the best record in the WNBA for the third consecutive season, behind the play of Seimone Augustus, Lindsay Whalen, and Maya Moore.

Joining the Sky in the playoffs were the defending WNBA champion Indiana Fever, who finished fourth after surviving a rash of injuries during the season; the Atlanta Dream, led by league scoring champion Angel McCoughtry; and the Washington Mystics, who were hoping to win their first playoff game since 2004.

The Los Angeles Sparks finished second in the West, behind the play of league MVP Candace Parker. They lost to Phoenix in the conference semifinals. Finally, the Seattle Storm surprised many by earning the final entry into the playoffs, allowing veteran and future hall-of-famer Tina Thompson to retire from a playoff team.

Standings

Playoffs and Finals

The opening round of the WNBA playoffs saw a rash of road team victories. Only the Minnesota Lynx and Indiana Fever went unbeaten on their home floors. The Chicago Sky, the top overall seed in the East, were swept by the Fever, while the Seattle Storm lost to the top-seeded Lynx in two games. In the Atlanta-Washington series, the road team won the first two games of the series, before Atlanta finally prevailed at home. Finally, in the matchup between the Phoenix Mercury and Los Angeles Sparks, the road teams went 3-0, with Phoenix advancing.

The conference finals were over quickly. Both the Atlanta Dream and Minnesota Lynx swept their opponents, setting up a rematch of the 2011 WNBA Finals. In the Finals, the Lynx once again swept the Dream, becoming the second WNBA team to sweep through the playoffs since the best-of-five finals format was adopted.

Awards

Players of the Week
The following players were named the Eastern and Western Conference Players of the Week.

Players of the Month
The following players were named the Eastern and Western Conference Players of the Month.

Rookie of the Month
The following players were named the Rookie of the Month.

Postseason awards

Coaches

Eastern Conference
Atlanta Dream: Fred Williams
Chicago Sky: Pokey Chatman
Connecticut Sun: Anne Donovan
Indiana Fever: Lin Dunn
New York Liberty: Bill Laimbeer
Washington Mystics: Mike Thibault

Western Conference
Los Angeles Sparks: Carol Ross
Minnesota Lynx: Cheryl Reeve
Phoenix Mercury: Corey Gaines and Russ Pennell
San Antonio Silver Stars: Dan Hughes
Seattle Storm: Brian Agler
Tulsa Shock: Gary Kloppenburg

See also
WNBA
WNBA Draft
WNBA All-Star Game
WNBA Playoffs
WNBA Finals

References

External links
Official Site

 
2013 in American women's basketball
2012–13 in American basketball by league
2013–14 in American basketball by league
Women's National Basketball Association seasons